The Cheap Magazine, subtitled "The Poor Man's Fireside Companion", was a fourpenny Haddington monthly published from 1813 to 1815 by George Miller (1771–1835), an East Lothian printer. As "one of the first attempts to diffuse a pure and useful literature among the less educated portion of Scotland", this effort foreshadowed later publications such as Chambers's Edinburgh Journal and the Penny Magazine. Yet a cheap price required a large circulation, and Miller's attempt to sustain a large readership without taking any definite religious position ended in financial failure.

References

George Miller, Later Struggles in the Journey of Life; or, the Afternoon of my Days: being the Retrospection of a Sexagenarian, 1833
J. O., Notes and Queries 6th series, 5 (1882), pp. 495–6
T. Fisher Unwin, Notes and Queries  10th series, 12 (1909), pp. 1–3, 42–44, 474

Monthly magazines published in the United Kingdom
Defunct literary magazines published in the United Kingdom
Magazines established in 1813
Magazines disestablished in 1815